Jorge Tadeu Mudalen (born 3 January 1955) is a Brazilian politician. He has spent his political career representing São Paulo, having served as federal deputy representative from 2003 to 2019.

Personal life
Mudalen is the son of Elias Mudalen and Farida Mudalen. Mudalen is a member of the neo-Pentecostal church Igreja Internacional da Graça de Deus.

Political career
Mudalen voted in favor of the impeachment motion of then-president Dilma Rousseff. Mudalen voted in favor of the 2017 Brazilian labor reform, and would vote against opening a corruption investigation into Rousseff's successor Michel Temer.

Mudalen caused some controversy in Brazil when he and several other evangelical politicians proposed a bill that would classify abortion as homicide.

References

1955 births
Living people
People from Guarulhos
Brazilian Pentecostals
Members of the International Grace of God Church
Brazilian Democratic Movement politicians
Progressistas politicians
Liberal Front Party (Brazil) politicians
Democrats (Brazil) politicians
Members of the Chamber of Deputies (Brazil) from São Paulo